SM UB-19 was a German Type UB II submarine or U-boat in the German Imperial Navy during World War I. The U-boat was ordered on 30 April 1915 and launched on 2 September 1915. She was commissioned into the German Imperial Navy on 16 December 1915 as SM UB-19.

Design
A German Type UB II submarine, ‘’UB-19’’  had a displacement of  when at the surface and  while submerged. The submarine was powered by two Daimler six-cylinder four-stroke diesel engines each producing  (a total of ), two Siemens-Schuckert electric motors producing , and one  propeller shaft.

The submarine's top submerged speed was 5.81 knots and its top surface speed was 9.15 knots (16.95 km/h; 10.53 mph). UB-19 was fitted with two  torpedo tubes in the bow, four torpedoes, and one  Tk L/40 deck gun. Her complement was twenty-three crew members.

Summary of raiding history

References

Notes

Citations

Bibliography

 

German Type UB II submarines
U-boats commissioned in 1915
World War I submarines of Germany
Maritime incidents in 1916
U-boats sunk in 1916
1915 ships
World War I shipwrecks in the English Channel
U-boats sunk by British warships
Ships built in Hamburg